Princess Helena may refer to:

 Princess Helena of Nassau (1831–1888), daughter of William, Duke of Nassau and wife of George Victor, Prince of Waldeck and Pyrmont
 Princess Helena of the United Kingdom (1846–1923), the fifth child and third daughter of Queen Victoria
 Princess Helena of Waldeck and Pyrmont (1861–1922), daughter of George Victor of Waldeck-Pyrmont and wife of Prince Leopold, Duke of Albany
 Princess Helena Victoria of Schleswig-Holstein (1870–1948), daughter of Princess Helena of the United Kingdom
 Princess Helena of Serbia (1884–1962), daughter of King Peter I of Yugoslavia
 Princess Helena Adelaide of Schleswig-Holstein-Sonderburg-Glücksburg (1888–1962), daughter of Friedrich Ferdinand, Duke of Schleswig-Holstein
 Princess Helena of Waldeck and Pyrmont (1899–1948), daughter of Friedrich, Prince of Waldeck and Pyrmont and wife of Nikolaus, Hereditary Grand Duke of Oldenburg
 Helena Kalokuokamaile Wilcox, Princess Helena Kalokuokamaile Keoua Wilcox Salazar-Mach, (1917–1988)
 Lady Helena Gibbs (1888–1969), born Princess Helena of Teck